Paung-deh or Paungde is a town in Pyay District, Pegu region in Burma (Myanmar). It is the administrative seat of Paungde Township.

References

External links
"Paungde Map — Satellite Images of Paungde" Maplandia

Township capitals of Myanmar

Populated places in Bago Region